Bharati Script is a constructed script, and an abugida created by a research team led by V. Srinivasa Chakravarthy at IIT Madras. It is designed to serve as a common script or link script for Indian languages.

Motive and Development 
Bharati is proposed to be a common script or link script of Indian languages, including both Indo-Aryan and Dravidian language families, much as the Latin script serves as a common script for many European languages including English, French, Spanish, German, Italian, etc. 

It may also serve the purpose of providing a written means for tribal languages that don't have a writing system.

V. Srinivasa Chakravarthy started this project at IIT Madras and a research team led by him developed it.

Features 

 Bharati script borrows characters and concepts from multiple scripts including Latin script, Devanagari, Tamil script, Gujarati script, etc.
 It is a left-to-right written abugida, thus it features consonant characters modified by vowel diacritics.
 The diacritics maybe placed below, upon or in the right of primary character.
 Like the Gujarati script, it does not feature a running horizontal line above the characters (which is a characteristic in Devanagri system).

Fonts 
Bharati script is supported in Windows, macOS, Linux and Android through the fonts made by the Bharati Script team. Currently two fonts exist:

 NavBharati: a TrueType Font (TTF) which supports transliteration of Devanagari, Tamil, Telugu, and Malayalam scripts into Bharati script.
 SundarBharati: an OpenType Font (OTF) which supports transliteration of Devanagari, Tamil, Telugu, Kannada, Bengali and Malayalam scripts into Bharati script.

The fonts work in two ways:

 transliterating already existing content into Bharati script - the text is automatically transliterated upon changing the font
 directly using an Indic Input tool (such as Intelligent Input Bus in unix-like systems) to type - either of the Bharati fonts is chosen, and as the text is typed, it appears in Bharati script

Optical Character Recognition (OCR) 
An OCR system has been developed which can recognise written or printed characters in Bharati script and convert them into digital text. This system has been integrated into one of the Bharati Script's official Android apps: "Bharati Handwriting Keyboard".

Android apps 
Bharati Script has its own set of official apps:

 Bharati Keyboard: It is a virtual keyboard that outputs the corresponding character in the script that has been chosen, based on the button pressed in Bharati script based button layout.
 Bharati Handwriting keyboard: It helps to input Bharati Script by recognising handwriting done on the screen, using OCR technologies.
 Bharti Transliterator: It helps to transliterate texts written in other scripts to Bharati script.

Mudra Bharati 
A finger-spelling system is proposed alongside Bharati script called 'Mudra Bharati', for use as a sign language.

Unlike American Sign Language convention, Mudra Bharati utilises two hands. 

A prototype has been developed using Self-Organizing Maps and Convolutional Neural Networks which can give out characters in Devanagri and Tamil scripts after recognition from Mudra Bharati.

References

External Links 

 Official Website of Bharati Script

Constructed scripts
Writing systems